Webco Records was a record label based in Vienna, Virginia that specialized in bluegrass and old-time music.

History
Webco Records was founded in 1980 by its namesake Mr. Wayne E. Busbice. Between 1985 and 1988, Bill Emerson was A&R director.

In 1989 Bill Emerson and his son John acquired the Webco label, and from 1990 until 1994 John Emerson operated the label as Webco Records of Virginia.

In 1994 Tom Riggs acquired the Webco label in 1994 to be part of Pinecastle Records. This deal included previous released and unreleased recordings, and recording contracts.

Pinecastle has since launched the Webco Classics imprint, on which select recordings previously released on the Webco label were compiled and reissued.

Roster

 Al Jones and Frank Necessary
 Bill Emerson
 Bill Harrell and The Virginians
 Bill Rouse and The Uptown Grass Band
 Bob Purkey and The Blueridge Travellers
 Bobby Atkins and the Countrymen
 Brooke Johns
 Busby Brothers
 Buzz Busby
 Carl Nelson
 Chris Warner
 D. J. & the C.B. Pickers
 Darrell Sanders
 Ernie Sykes
 Gloria Belle
 Hobbs & Partners
 Jack Fincham and The Dixie Grass
 James King
 Jeff Presley
 Jim Eanes
 Jimmy Gaudreau
 Joe Boucher
 Karen Spence and Friends of Bluegrass
 Larry Stephenson
 Pagter and Boucher
 Paul Adkins
 Pete Goble
 South Central Bluegrass
 The Blackthorn Stick Ceili Band
 The Grass Reflection
 The Overland Express
 The Reno Brothers

See also 
 List of record labels

References

External links
 

American record labels
American independent record labels